Hasan Durham (born 14 August 1971) is a Bermudian cricketer, who played with the Bermudian cricket team in their first One Day International when they played Canada in 2006. Durham took two wickets as Bermuda won the game by three wickets under the Duckworth-Lewis method.

In August 2006, after another One-day International against Canada, Durham was reported to the ICC as having a "potentially flawed bowling action". His action was eventually approved, and he went on to play nine ODIs for Bermuda.

References 

 
 Report on Durham's action being cleared

1971 births
Bermuda One Day International cricketers
Bermudian cricketers
Living people